Pantelimon Erhan Cabinet was the Cabinet of Moldova (7 / 20 December 1917 - 13 / 26 January 1918).

It was the first cabinet of the Moldavian Democratic Republic. The government fell after the occupation of the Republic by the Romanian troops. Erhan, along with Ion Inculeț, president of the National Assembly, and Gherman Pântea, Director of Armed Forces, were accused by the nationalist Directors of opposing the entry of the Romanian Army, sending the Moldavian National Guard against it, and negotiating  with the Bolshevik-dominated council that controlled the capital during early January.

Membership of the Cabinet 

On 7 December 1917, Parliament of Moldova (called Sfatul Țării) elected the Cabinet of Moldova (called the Council of Directors General), with nine members, seven Moldavians, one Ukrainian, and one Jew:
 
Pantelimon Erhan, President of the Council and Director General of Agriculture
Ion Pelivan, Director General of Foreign Affairs
Vladimir Cristi, Director General of Internal Affairs
Teodor Cojocaru and Gherman Pântea, Director General of War
Mihail Savenco, Director General of Justice
Teofil Ioncu, Director General of Finance
Ştefan Ciobanu, Director General of Public Instruction
Nicolae Bosie-Codreanu, Director General of Communications
Veniamin I. Grinfeld, Director General of Industry and Commerce

Notes

 

Moldova cabinets
1917 establishments in Russia
1918 disestablishments in Romania
Cabinets established in 1917
Cabinets established in 1918